Katherine B. Holt (born 1977) is a British chemist who is a professor at University College London. She serves as Vice Dean for Education in the Department of Mathematics and Physical Sciences. Her research investigates the development of carbon-based electrodes and electrocatalysis.

Early life and education 
Holt was born in the United Kingdom. Her parents were both chemistry teachers and she grew up around chemistry textbooks. She studied chemistry throughout high school, and was accepted to study in the Department of Chemistry at the University of Oxford. During her final year at Oxford, she joined the research group of John Foord, with whom she studied diamond thin films. She focussed on the creation of boron-doped diamond, which could be used as highly conductive electrodes. Holt stayed at the University of Oxford for doctoral research, where she looked to apply her conductive diamond films to electrochemical water waste treatment.

Research and career 
Holt became interested in research in the United States, and applied to the laboratory of Allen J. Bard at the University of Texas at Austin, where she started to work on biological systems, such as studying the impact of silver ions on Escherichia coli respiration. After two years in Texas, Holt returned to the United Kingdom, where she joined University College London. She worked as a Centenary Ramsay Fellow. She was appointed an Engineering and Physical Sciences Research Council advanced research fellow in 2006 and a lecturer at University College London in 2007. In 2018 she was promoted to Professor of Chemistry at UCL.

Holt's research investigates the use of chemistry to better understand biological processes. In particular, she has studied the creation and application of functional diamonds-based nanomaterials. She has shown that boron-doped and nanocrystalline diamond can be grown on metals using chemical vapor deposition, creating highly conductive thin films that can be used to detect metabolic products of living cells. She has studied diamond nanoparticles, which may find application in drug delivery and cellular imaging. Holt showed that diamond can be redox active, a surprising observation given diamond has a bandage of 5.47 eV and is generally considered an insulator. Instead, Holt believes that the redox properties of diamond originate in unsaturated surface bonds, as these interactions can dominate when nanoparticle size is < 5 nm.

Selected publications

Awards and honours
Holt was awarded the Edward Harrison Memorial Prize by the Royal Society of Chemistry (RSC) in 2007.

References 

Living people
British women chemists
1977 births
Alumni of the University of Oxford